Roderick Leon Milstead, Jr (born November 10, 1969) is the former head football coach at Delaware State University. He is a former American football guard in the National Football League for the Cleveland Browns, San Francisco 49ers and Washington Redskins. He played college football at Delaware State University.

Early years
Milstead attended Lackey High School, where he was a two-time All-State offensive lineman and helped lead his team to a Class B state championship in 1986. He participated in the Big 33 Football Classic game between the Maryland and Pennsylvania All-stars. He also played Basketball and was valuable member of the Track & Field team that won the 1987 Class B State Championship.

He accepted a football scholarship from Delaware State University, where he became a four-year starter at left guard. As a junior, he helped Delaware State average 298.7 rushing yards per game and 5.2 yards per rush. Finishing the season as the NCAA Division I-AA No. 2 ranked rushing offense, including a school record 518-yard rushing performance against Towson State University. As a senior, he helped his team register 380 yards rushing against Northeastern University.

He never missed a game or a practice, while making 42 straight starts at left guard. He was selected first-team All-MEAC three straight years and also received Division I-AA All-American honors in 1991.

In 2003, he was inducted into the Delaware State Athletic Hall of Fame. 2021 Mid Eastern Athletic Conference (MEAC) Hall of Fame Inductee.

Professional career

Dallas Cowboys
Milstead was selected by the Dallas Cowboys in the fifth round of the 1992 NFL Draft. On August 25, he was traded to the Cleveland Browns in exchange for a conditional draft choice (not exercised).

Cleveland Browns
On September 3, 1992, he was placed on the injured reserve list with a nerve problem in his back. He was released by the Cleveland Browns on September 1, 1993. He was later re-signed and spent 11 games on the inactive list. He was waived on August 28, 1994.

San Francisco 49ers
Milstead was signed by the San Francisco 49ers on September 15, 1994. The next year, he started a career-high 12 games.

He was released at the end of training camp on August 25, 1997 and later re-signed in October, that season he went on to appear in 4 games and was inactive in 5.

Washington Redskins
On March 3, 1998, he was signed as a free agent by the Washington Redskins and went on to start 11 games. In 1999, he was inactive for the first 5 games, before being released on October 23. He was re-signed on November 9, 1999, after Keith Sims was injured.

Denver Broncos
In 2000, he signed with the Denver Broncos and was released on August 17.

Personal life
Milstead coached the Lackey High School football team to 2 state appearances at Ravens stadium. He coached the offensive line at Delaware State University. In 2016, he took over as the head football coach at La Plata High School in La Plata, Maryland. Milstead was named head football coach at Delaware State on January 30, 2018.

Head coaching record

College

References

External links
 Delaware State profile
 Delaware State Athletic Hall of Fame profile

1969 births
Living people
American football offensive guards
Cleveland Browns players
Delaware State Hornets football coaches
Delaware State Hornets football players
North Carolina Central Eagles football coaches
San Francisco 49ers players
Washington Redskins players
High school football coaches in Maryland
People from Charles County, Maryland
Coaches of American football from Maryland
Players of American football from Maryland
Players of American football from Washington, D.C.
African-American coaches of American football
African-American players of American football
20th-century African-American sportspeople
21st-century African-American sportspeople